Cone is an unincorporated community in Crosby County, Texas, United States. It lies on U.S. Route 62, thirty-four miles northeast of Lubbock, has an estimated population of 70, and is the location of the Harmony Plains Singing School.

History
Named for early settler James Stanton Cone, the community of Cone was established in 1901, and was granted a post office sometime around 1903. On  14 February 1903, the Cone School began teaching students on land donated by a man by the name of Charles Travis, and by 1939 the community was home to 150 residents.

After the 1930s, however, the population began to decline. By 1965, the Cone school's enrollment had fallen so low that the district was forced to consolidate, sending the few remaining pupils to attend school in Ralls. By 1988 the population had fallen to less than fifty, and only three businesses and the post office remained in operation. By 2000, however, the population had rebounded to its current level of approximately 70.  Cone school building was purchased in 1966 by The Primitive Baptist Foundation and repurposed it as the Harmony Plains Singing School.

Education
Cone is served by the Ralls Independent School District.

Trivia

Cone is part of the Lubbock Metropolitan Statistical Area

See also
Blanco Canyon
Canyon Valley, Texas
Duffy's Peak
Estacado, Texas
Mount Blanco
White River (Texas)

References

External links

Unincorporated communities in Crosby County, Texas
Towns in Crosby County, Texas
Lubbock metropolitan area
Unincorporated communities in Texas